The Pareci–Xingu languages, also known as Paresi–Waura or Central Maipurean, are Maipurean / Arawakan languages of the Bolivian and western Brazilian Amazon.

Languages
Kaufman (1994) gives the following breakdown:

Paresí group
Paresí also known as Parecís, Haliti
Saraveca also known as Sarave (†)
Waurá group
Waura–Mehináku also known as Wauja, Meinaku
Yawalapiti also known as Jaulapiti
Custenau also known as Kustenaú (†)

More recent works by Fabre (2005) as well as Brandão and Facundes (2007) include Enawene Nawe in a subgroup with Paresí.

References

Arawakan languages